Joshua Eric Lynn (born December 14, 1969 in Santa Barbara, California) was the Chief Trial Deputy of Santa Barbara County, Santa Barbara, California from 2008 to 2010.  He was the lead prosecuting attorney in the trial of Jesse James Hollywood, who was convicted and sentenced to life in prison on February 5, 2010. He was terminated after his loss in an election in 2010.

Career

Lynn received his B.A. from the University of California at Santa Cruz and his J.D. from the University of San Diego Law School. He was a deputy district attorney for 14 years and was promoted to Chief Trial Deputy for South Santa Barbara County in 2008. He served as District Attorney when the elected District Attorney, Christie Stanley was unable to serve for an extended period of time because of illness.  As Chief Trial Deputy, Lynn supervised criminal operations, all prosecutions and all of the deputy district attorneys in the South County of Santa Barbara. He began his career as a prosecutor with the Santa Barbara District Attorney's Office in 1996. After heading up the Domestic Violence unit, he was assigned to gang, three strikes and violent felony cases.  He has taught Advanced Evidence at the Santa Barbara School of Law. Lynn received the Thomas Guerry Award in 2006. On June 15, 2010, Lynn was fired from the Santa Barbara County District Attorney’s Office for his alleged conduct following his loss to Joyce Dudley during the County’s District Attorney election.

Hollywood trial
The prosecutor maintained Hollywood kidnapped Nicholas Markowitz on August 6, 2000, from a street near his home, and two days later, in an attempt to cover up the kidnapping, ordered his friends to kill the boy. Although Hollywood was far from the scene of the murder when it occurred, Lynn's task was to prove that Hollywood was as guilty as the man who pulled the trigger. The fact that trial occurred nine years after the murder, added to the difficulty of prosecution of Hollywood. Hollywood was defended by James Blatt, winner of  Los Angeles Criminal Courts Bar Association's Trial Lawyer of the Year Award in 2005. Lynn replaced deputy district attorney Ronald J. Zonen, who had been  removed from the case because the prosecutor had shared confidential files with movie producers.

Beginning of Trial, May 15, 2009
Deputy District Attorney Joshua Lynn called Hollywood the mastermind behind the crimes.

Hollywood killed Nicholas Markowitz "like he pulled the trigger himself," Lynn said. "The evidence will show Mr. Hollywood is a ruthless coward."

Holding a large photo of Nicholas, Lynn told the jury of nine women and three men the victim was a troubled teen trying to find his place in life while smoking marijuana and fighting with his parents.

Prosecutors contend Nicholas was kidnapped by Hollywood and his cohorts in August 2000 just blocks from his home to put pressure on his half-brother Ben Markowitz to repay money he owed Hollywood for drugs.

Lynn presented a timeline of events surrounding the crime and said he planned to call witnesses who will testify about Hollywood's role. He also said Hollywood provided the gun that killed Nicholas and the car used to drive him to the gravesite.

Hollywood, whose only job was selling marijuana, decided to get rid of Nicholas after learning from an attorney that he could face life in prison for kidnapping, prosecutors have said.

Lynn likened Hollywood to a football offensive coordinator who sits far from the field and calls the plays. Hollywood had dinner with his girlfriend at a steakhouse in the Los Angeles area while Nicholas was murdered and buried, the prosecutor said.

Prosecution June 24, 2009
District Attorney Joshua Lynn held up an 8 by 10 photograph for the defendant. The picture was a school portrait of a sleepy-eyed boy with gelled brown hair and a sideways smile.

"Whom is this a picture of?" Lynn asked Jesse James Hollywood, who took the stand in his own defense this week.

"It's a picture of Nicholas Markowitz," Hollywood said.

"Do you realize that in your three hours of direct examination today you rarely mentioned Nick's name?" Lynn asked.

Hollywood stammered. Lynn went on: "This is what Nick looked like." Throughout the cross examination, Lynn made sure to only reference Nick in the past tense and he made sure Hollywood did the same.

Hollywood is the first witness for the defense. His testimony is, to be quite obvious, is meant to present a narrative for his case. Instead of being the masterminding drug-thug who exacted revenge on Ben Markowitz by abducting and murdering Ben's younger brother Nick, Hollywood portrays himself as a passive bystander to the violence. Hollywood maintains that when he and three other men assaulted Nick and "ushered" him into a van, he had no further plans to physically harm Nick. And although the gun that was used to kill Nick belonged to Hollywood, he was not present for its use. In this version, the slap-dash capture and subsequent murder of Nick Markowitz up in the mountains was devised and perpetrated by Hollywood's crew.

Lynn asked how much force Hollywood used when he pinned him against a tree, while his previously convicted accomplices William Skidmore and Jesse Rugge punched Nick in the stomach before they threw him in the van.

Hollywood explained that he had to use a significant amount of strength because "Nick is taller than me."

"Nick was taller than you. He was taller than you, Mr. Hollywood," Lynn said.

Lynn's questioning was controlled, methodical, and unrelenting. He challenged Hollywood to make definitive statements about the "decision-making." Lynn insisted that Hollywood pinpoint whether he believed each action he took "was a good idea or a bad idea."

Hollywood responded with the same answer several times: "It was a stupid idea."

Judge Brian Hill interrupted, unprompted. "You are not testifying on how you feel now," he said. "You are testifying on how you felt then."

Hollywood contends that it was because Ben Markowitz had smashed the windows of his West Hills home that he was motivated to drive by the Markowitz's house. According to Hollywood, he was looking for a confrontation with Ben. "It was the straw that broke the camel's back," he said.

Instead they found Nick.

Throughout his entire testimony, Hollywood has been careful to not use the words "kidnap" or "murder." He consistently referred to the crimes he's being accused of "the situation" or " the incident." Lynn tried to dismantle Hollywood's benign language. When Hollywood wouldn't budge, Lynn sarcastically adopted Hollywood's descriptions. Lynn referred to Nick's abduction as "the event that caused Nick to be ushered into the van." Several jury members smirked.

Closing Statement July 1, 2009
Calling Jesse James Hollywood a "child killer" and the "king of thugs," Santa Barbara County Chief Trial Deputy Josh Lynn yesterday delivered his closing statement in the man's capital murder trial.

Facing the jury of nine women and three men, the prosecutor asked for justice, saying the case isn’t about the defendant, but rather it is about the 15-year-old Jewish boy named Nicholas Markowitz, who would likely still be alive today if it wasn’t for a chance meeting with Hollywood.

"There is just a mountain of evidence against Mr. Hollywood and justice has waited nine years," Lynn, the lead prosecutor, said. "I would urge you to usher Mr. Hollywood into his new status as a convicted kidnapper and child killer … Convict him."

In his three-and-a-half hour closing statement, Lynn, backed by a PowerPoint presentation, combed over much of the witness testimony presented during the six-week trial, including that of Hollywood, who over the span of four days, delivered an exhaustive first-hand account of the events surrounding the murder.

The only problem with Hollywood's version, Lynn said, is that the defendant was lying.

"He looked you in the eye and he lied to your faces," he told the jury.

Though Lynn discussed a number of topics he believes Hollywood lied about, among the easiest to track are statements the defendant made that directly conflict with other witness testimony…

While prosecutors say Hollywood paid Hoyt to murder Nicholas, he also reportedly asked his friend Jesse Rugge to kill the boy for $2,000.

This testimony was delivered by Graham Pressley, who was convicted of second-degree murder for his role in the killing. On August 8, Pressley said Rugge told him about the solicitation. He said Rugge promised he wouldn’t hurt Nicholas and called Hollywood "crazy."

While the jury will ultimately decide who told the truth, Lynn wondered why so many witnesses would, for no apparent reason, lie for Hollywood.

"Why would he take the stand here and lie about these things?" the prosecutor asked of Saulsbury. "What is the motive for everyone to get on the stand and lie?"

Of course, many of the same witnesses who Lynn insists are telling the truth acknowledged lying to authorities in the past.

Lynn contends some of the witnesses initial reluctance to tell the truth was based on a chilling fear instilled by Hollywood, who at the time was only 20, and was operating a successful marijuana operation that was generating $10,000 in profit per month.

Two witnesses, Pressley and Brian Affronti, both said they were told to keep quiet about the kidnapping and killing.

At a barbecue on August 13, Pressley said he was told by Rugge to clam, and was asked if he was going to be a "liability." Asked by Lynn why he initially lied to police, Pressley said he was scared of Hollywood.

Although Hollywood was far from the murder when it occurred, Lynn said he is just as culpable as Hoyt, who was convicted of murder and is on death row at San Quentin State Prison.

Hollywood admitted to kidnapping Nicholas, saying he saw the boy walking down the street shortly after the windows at his home were broken out. Nicholas’ older brother, Ben Markowitz, who owed the defendant $1,200 in drug money at the time, had just claimed responsibility for breaking the windows.

During his testimony, the defendant said he pinned Nicholas up against a tree, asked where his brother was, and with the help of a friend, "ushered" the boy into the van. The group drove to Santa Barbara, and roughly two days later, Hoyt brutally murdered the boy.

Lynn said the initial kidnapping triggered a chain of events that resulted in the boy's death. And despite witness testimony that Nicholas was smoking marijuana and playing video games with his captors, the prosecutor said Hollywood continued to exert control over the situation, and the boy was never free to leave.

All of this, Lynn said, makes Hollywood "guilty as sin."

Before concluding, Lynn showed three gruesome pictures of Nicholas’ bullet-riddled body after it was unearthed from the shallow grave at Lizard's Mouth. The boy's parents, who have been in court nearly every day of the trial, wept.

"Look at Nick Markowitz," he said to the jury. "This is what was left of Nick."

References

http://www.edhat.com/site/tidbit.cfm?nid=164852&showcomments=T
http://www.edhat.com/site/tidbit.cfm?nid=33302&showcomments=T

External links
Attorney James Blatt profile 
 https://www.noozhawk.com/article/081710_josh_lynn_opens_up_own_practice_representing_braun
 https://www.noozhawk.com/article/061510_lynn_dismissed_from_da_office
 http://www.lynn-obrien.com

California lawyers
Living people
American prosecutors
University of California, Santa Cruz alumni
University of San Diego School of Law alumni
1969 births
People from Santa Barbara, California